Scytosiphon lomentaria is a littoral brown seaweed with an irregularly lobed many filamentous form. It is a member of the Phaeophyta in the order Dictyosiphonales and grows attached to shells and stones in rock-pools and in near-shore waters. The attachment to the substrate is by a small disc shaped holdfast.

Description
Scytosiphon lomentaria has cylindrical, shiny, olive brown, unbranched fronds up to 400 mm long. They have short stalks and a large number may arise from a single holdfast. They widen to 3-10mm and narrow again near the tip. They are hollow and often have irregular constrictions.

Distribution and habitat
This species is cosmopolitan in distribution being found in temperate waters around the world. The type location is Denmark. It occurs in the littoral zone and favours wave-exposed shores and rock pools. Small plants are often found growing on limpets and pebbles.

References

Dictyosiphonales